The 1893 Wyoming Cowboys football team represented the University of Wyoming as an independent during the 1893 college football season. In its first season of college football, the team played only one game, defeating Cheyenne High School by a 14–0 score. Fred Hess was the team's coach. There was no team captain.

Schedule

References

Wyoming
Wyoming Cowboys football seasons
College football undefeated seasons
Wyoming Cowboys football
Wyoming Cowboys football